The Roman Catholic Diocese of Yingkou/Yingkow is a diocese located in the city of Yingkou (Liaoning) in the Ecclesiastical province of Shenyang 瀋陽 in China.

History
 July 14, 1949: Established as Diocese of Yingkou 營口 from Metropolitan Archdiocese of Shenyang 瀋陽

Leadership
 Bishops of Yingkou (Roman rite)
 Bishop André-Jean Vérineux, M.E.P. (July 14, 1949 – January 10, 1983)

References

 GCatholic.org
 Catholic Hierarchy

Roman Catholic dioceses in China
Christian organizations established in 1949
Roman Catholic dioceses and prelatures established in the 20th century
1949 establishments in China
Christianity in Liaoning
Yingkou